The wood snipe (Gallinago nemoricola) is a species of snipe which breeds in the Himalayas of northern India, Nepal, Bhutan and southern China. In winter, it occurs at lower altitudes in the Himalayas, as a regular visitor in small numbers to north Vietnam. it also occurs as a vagrant in central and southern India, Sri Lanka, Bangladesh, Myanmar, north Thailand and Laos.

This is a dark snipe,  in length, with a short, broad-based bill. It breeds in alpine meadows above , moving to lower altitudes in the winter.

This species is classified as vulnerable, with a population of less than 10,000 birds. Major threats to its existence include habitat loss and hunting. It has been recorded in some protected areas, including Langtang and Sagarmatha National Parks in Nepal.

References 

 BirdLife Species Factsheet

wood snipe
Birds of North India
Birds of Nepal
Birds of Bhutan
Birds of Central China
Birds of South Asia
Birds of Southeast Asia
wood snipe
Taxa named by Brian Houghton Hodgson